The Kerala Film Critics Association Award for Best Actor is an award presented annually at the Kerala Film Critics Association Awards, honouring the best performances by female actors in Malayalam films.

Superlatives

Winners

See also
 Kerala Film Critics Association Award for Best Actor

References

Actress
Film awards for lead actress